The 44th Golden Bell Awards (Mandarin:第44屆金鐘獎) was held on October 16, 2009 at Sun Yat-sen Memorial Hall in Taipei, Taiwan. The ceremony was broadcast live by TTV.

Winners and nominees
Below is the list of winners and nominees for the main categories.

References

2009
2009 television awards
2009 in Taiwan